Philip Jennings (c.1679 – 10 February 1740) of Dudleston Hall, Shropshire was an English lawyer and politician.

He was the oldest son of Edward Jennings, QC, a barrister who later became Member of Parliament (MP) for East Looe. Philip was a nephew of Admiral Sir John Jennings. He was educated at Eton and St John's College, Cambridge. He was called to the bar at the Inner Temple in 1704 and became a bencher in 1735. He succeeded his father in 1725.

He sat in the House of Commons of Great Britain from 1715 to 1722, as MP for Queenborough.

He married twice: firstly in 1705, Diana, the daughter of Sir William Bowyer, 2nd Bt., of Denham, Buckinghamshire, with whom he had a son, who predeceased him, and a daughter and secondly in 1721, Dorothy, the daughter of George Clerke of Launde Abbey, Leicestershire, with whom he had 3 sons and 6 daughters.

References 
 

1679 births
Year of birth uncertain
1740 deaths
People educated at Eton College
Alumni of St John's College, Cambridge
Members of the Inner Temple
Members of the Parliament of Great Britain for English constituencies
British MPs 1715–1722